Philip Dane Beall Jr. (June 15, 1915 – April 12, 1988) was an American politician in the state of Florida. He served in the Florida State Senate from 1947 to 1962 as a Democratic member for the 2nd district. He succeeded his father, Philip D. Beall Sr. in the State Senate after his death in 1947.

References

1915 births
1988 deaths
People from Pensacola, Florida
Democratic Party Florida state senators
Pork Chop Gang
20th-century American politicians